Lea South (born 28 May 1973), better known as Ismael Lea South, is an English rapper, community activist and youth worker of Jamaican descent.

Early life
South was in Willesden, London, England. Both his parents are from Jamaica, his father came to the United Kingdom in the late 1950s and his mother in the early 1960s. He was brought up as a Christian.

South attended South Kilburn High School and studied marketing at London College of Communication. He started writing lyrics at school. He later joined an underground group Strictly Business with Gee and Mic Check One. They were later signed by an underground recording label. He converted to Islam in this process and left due to artistic content disagreements.

Career
South met Rakin Fetuga in Hyde Park's Speakers' Corner and then later at a Muslim event in Westminster University. After working together in an aromatherapy business, Rakin and him formed the group Mecca2Medina in 1996.

South is a project and events manager for the Black Youth Drugs Line, which works against drugs and anti-social behaviour in UK inner cities.

He has co-hosted and managed the urban stages at the Islam Expo in Olympia and the Global Peace and Unity Event in ExCeL Exhibition Centre. He co-hosts Islam Channel's urban show Brother's in the Deen.

In 2006, South co-founded The Salam Project with Rakin Fetuga, which organises urban Islamic events and initiatives. He organises Muslim Hip hop and comedy events such as the Muslim Hip Hop Summit. He also co-founded of TSP Urban Youth.

He also works as a consultant in Islamic urban projects in the Muslim community and is a learning mentor at Bright Futures Consulting. He is currently working on Crescent Moon Media recording label.

In March 2014, South was interviewed by Mark Dean on BBC Radio Northampton, discussing specialised support for Muslim converts from Britain's African and Caribbean communities.

Personal life
In April 2008, South got married. He lives in London with his wife and daughter.

See also

Black British
British Jamaican
British hip hop
List of converts to Islam
Islamic music
Nasheed

References

External links
Mecca2Medina website
Muslims in the House. emel. Issue 8, November/December 2004

1973 births
Living people
English Muslims
English people of Jamaican descent
Converts to Islam from Christianity
English hip hop musicians
English male rappers
Black British male rappers
Performers of Islamic music
English social workers
Rappers from London
People from Willesden
Alumni of the London College of Communication